Lieutenant Colonel Jonetani Kaukimoce was a Fijian politician, who served in the House of Representatives from 1992 to 2006. From 1992 to 1999 he stood under the Soqosoqo ni Vakavulewa ni Taukei (SVT) banner. In the parliamentary election of September 2001 he won the Tamavua Laucala Urban Fijian Communal Constituency, for the Soqosoqo Duavata ni Lewenivanua Party (SDL).

Kaukimoce served as a Government Minister between 1992 and 1999 in various portfolios including Youth and Sports, Tourism, Transport, Communication, Housing, Environment and Health. He was appointed transport and civil aviation minister in 1993. He was sacked as Minister of Housing in April 1995.

In his last 5-year term as a Member of Parliament he was Leader of the House from 2001 to 2006, but was not renominated by the SDL and retired from politics at the 2006 parliamentary election held on 6–13 May, and was succeeded by Jone Waqairatu.  Kaukimoce was quoted in the Fiji Times on 3 April as claiming that he had won the SDL primary election, but had been rejected by the party hierarchy.

Kaukimoce died at the CWM Hospital on 11 March 2010. He was survived by his wife, Sisilia Tupou Kaukimoce [nee Fotu], five sons, a daughter, and eleven grandchildren.

References 

Year of birth missing (living people)
Living people
I-Taukei Fijian members of the House of Representatives (Fiji)
Sports ministers of Fiji
Tourism ministers of Fiji
Transport ministers of Fiji
Communication ministers of Fiji
Housing ministers of Fiji
Environment ministers of Fiji
Health ministers of Fiji
Soqosoqo Duavata ni Lewenivanua politicians
Soqosoqo ni Vakavulewa ni Taukei politicians
Politicians from Suva